Samuel Hsieh (Traditional Chinese: 謝森)  (born 26 July 1978) is a Hong Kong touring car racing driver. He is currently competing in TCR China for Teamwork Motorsport in a Volkswagen Golf GTi TCR.

Early years
Hsieh made his debut in 2004 at the age of 24 at Zhuhai International Circuit, and entered a weekend of the Hong Kong Touring Car Championship with a Honda Civic.

Due to financial reasons, he was yet to race again until 2009, when he sold his road car to acquire a used Group N Honda Integra race car to make his full season return.

Career

Hong Kong Touring Car Championship (2009-2012)
Hsieh took part in N2000 Class with China Dragon Racing; he also raced in Macau Grand Prix’s supporting race the same year.

In 2010/2011, he continued in Hong Kong's championship and the Macau Grand Prix. He also had one round appearance at the China Touring Car Championship in 2010, Zhuhai.

In 2012, he switched to 'Road Sport', a category for heavily modified road cars held by Hong Kong Automobile Association, where he worked with China Dragon Racing by becoming their test/race driver for the team's Subaru Impreza. He entered the season with just two races, finishing both on the podium.

Touring Car Series in Asia (2013)
Hsieh set foot into a regional championship with China Dragon Racing, using their Subaru at Malaysia’s Sepang Circuit, and finished the season second overall in the championship with 4 podiums.

Return to the Hong Kong Touring Car Championship (2014)
In 2014, after two years spent in Road Sport, Hsieh was set to return to race Group N for Teamwork Motorsport, where he had 3 wins and finished second in the championship, just 2 points shy of taking the season title.

Chinese Racing Cup (2014)
A runner-up finish in Hong Kong's championship rewarded him with the opportunity to represent Hong Kong Automobile Association to race against other ASN drivers in the Greater China Region.
He claimed victory at the round in Macau, and finished 6th in the series.

China Touring Car Championship (2015-2016)
Hsieh joined the grid of the China Touring Car Championship in 2015, driving a Citroën C-Elysée run by Teamwork Motorsport, whilst still chasing funds to compete in the full season. He scored 2 front row starts including 1 pole position among his 3 appearances. At the end of the season he was able to return to the championship for a one-off duty with factory outfit Changan Ford Racing Team.

In 2016, he landed a half season drive with another factory-supported team, Haima Z1 Racing. He outscored his teammates in the drivers' standings, but had yet to secure the drive for the rest of the season.

China GT Championship (2016)
Hsieh made his GT debut in the inaugural season of the China GT Championship, driving an Audi R8 LMS for Beijing outfit Ling Rui 300+. He finished as runner-up in the GTC drivers' standings.

TCR China (2017)
Hsieh joined hands with Teamwork Motorsport in the inaugural season of TCR China, pairing up with Macanese driver Filipe de Souza in a Volkswagen Golf GTi TCR.

Macau Grand Prix (2009-2014)
Hsieh has competed at their supporting races on six occasions; from 2009 to 2011 with China Dragon Racing in a Honda Integra, and in 2012 and 2013 in their Subaru Impreza.

He was awarded the 'Hong Kong Driver Bronze Award' by the Hong Kong Automobile Association in 2013, by finishing third among Hong Kong drivers in the 'Macau Road Sport Challenge' at the 60th Macau Grand Prix.

Hsieh won the Macau round of the Chinese Racing Cup in 2014 with a Senova D70.

Endurance Racing (2012-2016)
Hsieh participated in endurance races in the Guangdong International Circuit regularly, he raced events from 3 hours to 12 hours with Peugeot 307, Volkswagen Scirocco, Renault Clio and Toyota 86, and he had claimed three class wins and a second place in 8 outings.

Fitness
Inspired by Jenson Button, Hsieh stays fit through triathlon, which aids his endurance performance and mental toughness. He competes up to Half-Ironman distance.

Career summary

TCR Spa 500 results

References

1978 births
Living people
Hong Kong racing drivers
TCR Asia Series drivers